Cheshmeh Kabud-e Olya (also Romanized as Cheshmeh Kabūd-e ‘Olyā; also known as Cheshmeh Kabūd-e Bālā) is a village in Jalalvand Rural District, Firuzabad District, Kermanshah County, Kermanshah Province, Iran. At the 2006 census, its population was 42, in 11 families.

References 

Populated places in Kermanshah County